Making Montgomery Clift is a 2018 American documentary film by directors Robert Anderson Clift and Hillary Demmon chronicling the life of the actor Montgomery Clift till his death in 1966. It shows a different side to Clift, portraying him as a man who enjoyed life and love, and was comfortable enough with him being a gay man. The documentary was released at the Los Angeles Film Festival and was praised by the critics.

Synopsis 
Between the forties and sixties actor Montgomery Clift saw the highs and lows of both his career and personal life, in virtue of that many myths were created mostly involving his repressed homosexuality and his depression due to a car accident that left severe facial lacerations which required plastic surgery. Directed by his nephew Robert Clift and Hillary Demmon, the film examines the inconsistent narratives from countless biographies which reduced his legacy and created labels like “tragically self-destructive” and “tormented”. The documentary shows Clift family and friends—including Jack Larson, who played Jimmy Olsen on the TV show Adventures of Superman—who attest to his joy and humor, and also Tucker Tooley, Michael Easton, Patricia Bosworth, and Vincent Newman.

Critical reception
The documentary was praised by most critics, Ben Sachs from Chicago Reader wrote that the intense focus in demystifying some of Clift's biographies rather than facts about Clift's involvement in classics like Red River, I Confess and Wild River are "frustrating", but conclude that "his nephew does an admirable job assembling the truth". In his review for The New Yorker, Michael Schulman wrote that the documentary "is a fascinating study of the ethics of biography". In his column in TheWrap website Dan Callahan wrote that although there has not yet been a narrative biopic on the actor's life the documentary "should be consulted as a more realistic picture of this committed, very loving and sophisticated artist who was forced to make very few compromises.", he also called the title "provocative" because "it has a double meaning" and according to him "to “make” someone, in old-fashioned slang, is to sleep with them, but this is also a movie about the making of Clift's posthumous image, and Robert Clift very carefully separates fact from fiction or misrepresentation here, clearing away most of the sub-Freudian interpretation of his uncle's life that seemed reasonable or fashionable 40 years ago."

Home media
The movie was released in digital, on demand, and DVD.

References

External links
 Making Montgomery Clift Official Website.

2018 films
2018 LGBT-related films
American documentary films
American LGBT-related films
Documentary films about actors
2018 documentary films
2010s English-language films
2010s American films